Love, Wrinkle-free is a 2012 Indian English-language adult romantic film directed by Sandeep Mohan and starring Ash Chandler and Shernaz Patel.

Cast 
Ash Chandler as Savio Monteiro 
Shernaz Patel as Annie 
Arika Silaichia as Ruth
Theron C. as Rajiv Bhatia
Seema Rahmani as Natalie
Sohrab Ardeshir as Bruno Corrieo 
Ashwin Mushran as Jacob
Marianne Borgo as Valerie
Giju John as Cleetez D'Cruz
 Arika Silaichia as Ruth Monteiro
Guneet Monga as Florence Monga
Dasang Tensing as Tashi
Ankush Batra as Kaladhar

Release 
The film was showcased at several film festivals including Mumbai International Film Festival, Cinequest Film Festival in San Jose and South Asian International Film Festival. The Times of India gave the film a rating of three out of five stars and stated that "It’s simple, pure, and breaks cosmetic clichés - that’s the beauty. But halfway through the film, the wrinkles steep deeper, in the script that is". Hindustan Times gave the film a review of two-and-a-half stars and stated that "Love, Wrinkle-Free is one of those films that mix charm and tedium in equal doses". Bollywood Life wrote that "Best thing about LWF is that it is not gimmicky and everything about the film is real".

References

External links 

Love Wrinkle-free on Bollywood Hungama

Indian romance films
Films shot in Goa
2012 romance films
2012 films
English-language Indian films
2010s English-language films
2012 multilingual films
Indian multilingual films
Indian romantic drama films